A trade secret is a formula, practice, process, design, instrument, pattern, or compilation of information which is not generally known or reasonably ascertainable, by which a business can obtain an economic advantage over competitors or customers.

Trade secret may  also refer to:

Trade Secret (Australian company), a defunct Australian discount department store 
"Trade Secrets", an episode of BattleTech

See also